Harold D. Prewitt, Jr (Hal) (born October 1, 1954, in Hutchinson, Kansas) is an artist, photographer, race car driver, businessperson, inventor of personal computer products and early pioneer in the personal computer revolution. He resides in South Beach (Miami Beach, Florida).

Prewitt competed in professional and occasionally amateur motorsport road races and has driven in nearly 200 endurance racing or sprint races worldwide. He was the No. 1 American and finished 4th of 819 international drivers from 58 countries in the 2015 International Endurance Series Championship. He has been a competitor in IMSA, Grand-Am Rolex Sports Car Series and at international FIA races including 24 Hours of Daytona, 24 Hours Nürburgring, Dubai 24 Hour, 24 Hours of Barcelona and Silverstone Britcar 24-Hour.

In the 1970s and 1980s he was one of the early creators of personal computer products, developing popular software and hardware while helping build a new industry. He provided consulting services to IBM and is credited with inventing hard disk drives and world's first local area network (LAN) for their first portable computer, the IBM 5100, and their first desktop computer the IBM 5120.

He created the technology and trademarked Hotplug the computer's industries standard method of replacing computer system components without the need for stopping or shutting down key parts such as disk drives, disk controller or host adapter and power supplies. Prewitt's first patent details were disclosed in 1987 in USA and Europe related to development of the technology however the filings were not completed.  The trademark was issued by the USPTO and other countries in 1992 under "Computer & Software Products & Electrical & Scientific Products Trademarks".

Skilled in computer programming and engineering, Prewitt founded and managed a number of technology firms. The largest and best known was Core International, a developer of disk array, computer data storage and backup products. Core created and in 1990 marketed the world's first disk drives, disk controller or host adapter and power supplies that were hot pluggable or swappable. Prewitt was chairman and chief executive officer until 1993 when the company was sold to Sony.

Prewitt is the Managing Member of Prewitt Enterprises, a Florida-based agricultural and investment business.

Early life

Youth
Prewitt grew up in the Daytona Beach, Florida, area and lived there from 1963 to 1976. There he had his first exposure to auto racing; volunteering at Daytona International Speedway. He built his first computer in 1967 at 13. It performed simple math, which he disliked so much in school, and operated his phonograph. He joined the Civil Air Patrol as a cadet and earned his way to the second highest rank (Cadet Lt. Colonel), learning leadership, search and rescue, about the military and the value of providing community service. Prewitt learned how to fly a plane, soloed at 16 and shortly thereafter earned his Private Pilots License at the youngest age allowed.

As a teenager, Prewitt learned sailing, fishing, boating and scuba diving and developed skills in mechanics, engineering, electronics, navigation and construction. After school and in summers, he worked at jobs building homes and in a restaurant washing dishes and cooking. In high school, he rented out the family houseboat. He was interested in painting and photography – he produced and sold a number of images.

After graduating high school, Prewitt continued building boats, managing his business and began to focus on computer programming. Between 1972 and 1975 he learned various programming languages using an IBM 1130. In the early 1970s, Prewitt dreamed of designing, building and selling a generation of small business computers with a price tag much less than the going rate of $50,000. Convinced that there was a market, Prewitt unsuccessfully sought venture capital to get his plans off the ground. In 1975, he built an Altair 8800. That same year, at the age of 21, Prewitt obtained his first business applications customer when he sold, designed and wrote computer programs for the IBM 5100 and System/32 as part of the business he had started at age 16. He joined the Sports Car Club of America (SCCA) and participated in autocross events.

Family
Prewitt was born in Hutchinson, Kansas. Prewitt's father joined the US Air Force underage at 13 years old using his older brother's ID and then switched to the US Navy at 17 serving in World War II and Korea. His father left the military after 18 years (1945–62), did odd jobs and then worked as a mailman for the US Postal Service until his death. Prewitt's father was honored as a Kentucky Colonel by the Governor of Kentucky. His mother was a Registered nurse and lives in the Daytona Beach, Florida area.

Prewitt married his first wife Florine Andrews in August 1980 and divorced after 23 years in early 2004. They have two sons, Calvin and Tim. He married Corinne Brody (Loria) in October 2007. She has a son, Alex.

Education
Prewitt attended All Souls Catholic School (1960–63) in Sanford, Florida, until 3rd grade while his father served in the military. He attended Port Orange Elementary School (1963–65) from 3rd to 5th grade when his family moved to Allandale, Florida. In 1966, his family moved to Ormond Beach, Florida, where he attended Osceola Elementary (1965–66), Seabreeze Jr. High (1966–69) and then graduated from Seabreeze High School (1969–72). At 16, he attended Burnside-Ott Aviation in Miami, Florida where he soloed. After high school, Prewitt attended Daytona Beach Community College (1972–76) studying business and computer science but left without earning a degree. He transferred to Florida Atlantic University (1976–78), Boca Raton, Florida, where he continued his studies in business and computer science. Prewitt dropped out of college to focus on his business.

Careers
Prewitt's working career began at the age of 13. He started in construction helping build homes for an Ormond Beach, Florida builder. He also worked busing tables and washing dishes before a promotion to cook at a couple of local restaurants. At 16, Prewitt started his first business. While attending community college, he built boats, worked as a painter, an accountant and for the yard crew at the Howard Boat Works marina. Prewitt's final jobs where he was employed by someone else were as a lab assistant helping students in his college and as a computer programmer for a company providing business applications on mainframes and mini computers.

Businesses

Ranger Systems

Prewitt started his first business when he was 16 and a junior in High School. "Ranger Systems", had four divisions: Ranger Manufacturing, Business World, Rent a Houseboat and Ranger Automotive Engineering.

He used the manufacturing part of the business to build electronics, computers and fiberglass boats from 13' fishing runabouts to a 40' houseboat. Business World did marketing, photography, printing and advertising. Prewitt wrote brochures, shot pictures, placed ads and ran a printing press. The biggest and most profitable division was Rent a Houseboat. Prewitt took the family boat and turned it into a rental business. He sometimes used a small boat to travel to school and quickly reach the houseboat. Prewitt did everything from writing contracts to maintenance. Prewitt frequently missed classes to unstop a toilet or revive the boat engine. The automotive division focused on repairs.

Prewitt operated Ranger Systems from 1970 to 1975 until his focus switched to computer programming and the personal computer industry.

International Computer

In 1975, Prewitt created International Computer to continue building, selling, installing and programming computers. This was the period when he started developing storage devices which ultimately became his most successful products. He had customers that were located from mid to south Florida in manufacturing, hotel, service, legal, medical, construction and agricultural industries. Prewitt flew to their offices by initially renting aircraft and then by using his own.

Prewitt started Southeast Computer Consultants with a partner in late 1977.

Core International (Core)

In late 1979, Prewitt as sole owner created Core International from the assets of International Computer and Southeast Computer Consultants. Initially Core was created as a for-profit association of owners and operators of small IBM computers. It sold mail-order computer supplies and developed software for users of the IBM 5100, 5110 and IBM 5120 systems.

Prewitt built his first computer storage product for the IBM 5100 series because the machines did not have hard disk drives. Prewitt contracted with Control Data Corporation to manufacture the key component. Even though it was a niche product, the product became popular almost overnight when IBM discontinued its 5100 series and their customers turned to Core for parts and supplies. Within two years, Prewitt had sold $2.5 million worth of disk drives.

Core's second hardware and major software product also catered to the IBM orphans, a device and software that allowed IBM 5110/20 users to transfer data and programs from old bulky computers into new personal computers, which in 1981 were revolutionizing the computer industry. Core's software was called PC51 and allowed any DOS personal computer to use, unmodified, any BASIC program written for the IBM 5110/20 series computer. IBM consequently approached Core to become an IBM dealer. Customers could buy an integrated IBM PC, which completely replaced IBM's 5100 computers, or optionally attach their 5100 to Core's local area network, connecting all machines. These were revolutionary products and Core was the only source.

The company expanded internationally to include offices in Europe and Asia. In 1986, Inc Magazine selected Core as 21st in their annual list (Inc. 500) of the 500 fastest-growing private companies in the U.S.. By 1990, Core was well known as an industry leading developer of disk array, computer data storage and backup products. COREtest became the industry standard and most often quoted benchmark used to test, evaluate and compare performance of hard disk drives.

Many of Prewitt's products were the first of their kind, had no direct competition and were widely regarded for their superior performance and reliability. He was chairman and chief executive officer of Core until 1993 when the company was sold to Sony.

Prewitt Enterprises

Prewitt is the Managing Member of Prewitt Enterprises, a Florida-based agricultural and investment business with offices in Boca Raton and Miami, Florida, and in Park City, Utah. The agricultural part of the business grows oranges and at its peak produced more than 1.5 million half gallon cartons of orange juice per year with much of it used in Tropicana's Pure Premium. The investment division is active in private and public businesses in both the U.S. and internationally.

Prewitt Management

Prewitt is the Managing Member of Prewitt Management, a Florida-based fine-art photography business with offices in Boca Raton, Florida; Miami, Florida and Park City, Utah. Prewitt's photography is often of nature and panoramic landscapes.

Racing – Notable wins and finishes

Prewitt retired in 2015 after driving in more than 200 professional level (most televised or broadcast) and other events held worldwide. He qualified for a career total 200 races (140 Sprint and 60 Endurance) and drove in 30 endurance (24 hours or longer) events at 33 tracks in races held by IMSA (part of NASCAR), other in the USA and international events. He has won 73 firsts, 30 seconds and 10 third places for 41% wins in 180 starts and for 63% podium finishes. He has a low 3.61% did not finish (DNF) incident rate. 

He first became active in racing while growing up in Daytona Beach, Florida in the 1970s and driving in SCCA events. He became serious in 2004 after attending Skip Barber Racing School.

Prewitt was a professional level driver racing for many teams in selected International and North American Endurance road race events supporting his sponsors and EveryLapCounts.com, a global fund raising effort for children's charitable causes. He enjoyed Endurance rather than Sprint racing.

In his final year (2015), he finished as the No. 1 American and 4th out of 819 international drivers from 58 countries in the 2015 International Endurance Series Championship.

After 2007 and until retiring, he raced in many endurance races held worldwide and at most F1 tracks.  Most of these were televised or broadcast.

For many years he mostly driven for Cor Euser Racing in many BMW, and Lotus Evora.

In 2006 and 2007, Prewitt won numerous 1st place and class wins while racing in Historic Sportscar Racing (HSR), Rolex Endurance Series and the Historic GT Series. He won the 2006 National Auto Sport Association (NASA) National Championship at Mid-Ohio Sports Car Course while driving the Porsche 911 GT3 RS that won 2nd place in class for the 2003 24 Hours of Le Mans.

From 2004 to 2006, he captured numerous lap records in SCCA, PBOC Motorsports Club and National Auto Sport Association (NASA) classes and was overall winner in the PBOC 2005 and 2006 Race Series season.

Fishing

Prewitt is a sport fisherman. Over the years, he has caught and released more than one thousand Billfish with many of them tagged for science research. Most of these were captured "stand up", not using a fishing chair and on light tackle. Prewitt was selected as Atlantic Ocean Angler of the Year 1992, recognized and awarded by International Game Fish Association (IGFA) as the angler who Tagged & Released the most Sailfish in 1990, 1991 and 1992 and White Marlin in 1992. In 1989, Power and Motoryacht Magazine named him one of America's Top Ten Anglers of 1988.

In 1988, he won the Bahamas Billfish Championship (BBC). This annual award recognizes the overall champion of six tournaments located in the Bahamas held on Bimini, Cat Cay, Walker's Cay, Berry Islands and the Abacos.

Politics and public service
Beginning in the mid-1990s, Prewitt served as a Commissioner on the Architectural and Code Enforcement Boards prior to his 2001 unopposed election to the Town Commission of Manalapan, Florida where he held office until the town was reapportioned in 2002. Prewitt served on the Florida Atlantic University Executive Advisory Board and Palm Beach Countywide Beaches & Shores Council.

Personal
Prewitt is dyslexic, thus has difficulty reading and spelling.

In March 2009, one of the corporations Prewitt manages, bought for a real estate investment  a house in Park City, Utah, that had belonged to Massachusetts Governor Mitt Romney since 1999.

Prewitt's wife, Corinne, is a graduate of the Wharton School, University of Pennsylvania, and was an Assistant County Manager for the $7 billion Miami-Dade County government, overseeing strategic planning, human resources, and technology initiatives.

References

External links

Career summary at Driver Database

Landscape photographers
Nature photographers
Travel photographers
20th-century American businesspeople
21st-century American businesspeople
20th-century American artists
21st-century American artists
1954 births
Living people
Farmers from Florida
Artists from Miami
People from Park City, Utah
Photographers from Florida
Photographers from Utah
American conservationists
Sportspeople from Hutchinson, Kansas
24 Hours of Daytona drivers
Rolex Sports Car Series drivers
Trans-Am Series drivers
Sportspeople from Daytona Beach, Florida
Computer hardware engineers
Racing drivers from Kansas
Racing drivers from Florida
People from Ormond Beach, Florida
Businesspeople from Florida
American inventors
American software engineers
American computer businesspeople
American technology chief executives
American technology company founders
Businesspeople in information technology
American investors
American computer programmers
Seabreeze High School alumni
Sportspeople with dyslexia
Nürburgring 24 Hours drivers
24H Series drivers
GT4 European Series drivers